Stanley Jegede is a Nigerian entrepreneur, businessman and philanthropist. He is considered one of the individuals transforming the Nigerian telecommunications space, in almost two decades. He co-founded Phase3 Telecom, a firm licensed as National Long Distance Operator (NLDO) by the Nigerian Communications Commission (NCC) in 2003. And he was instrumental in building the company from a local firm to one of West Africa's prominent digital infrastructure and, connectivity network with optic fibre over power lines model. He is currently Executive Chairman at Phase3 Telecom

Early life
Jegede was born to Samuel and Victoria Jegede in Zaria, a city (one of the original seven Hausa city-states), situated in Nigeria's Northern territory and home to the Zazzau Emirate and Ahmadu Bello University - Nigeria's largest government owned tertiary institution. He grew up as a middle child flanked by both older and younger siblings under the tutelage of firm but loving parents. And he always credited his power of determination and strength of purpose to his mother and father's classroom of discipline, warmth, wisdom and faithful instructions.

Career 
Jegede obtained a B.Sc. (honours) in business information systems from the University of North London in 1995 and M.Sc in business information technology from Middlesex University, in 1996. He worked as a Business Analyst in the United Kingdom between 1997 and 1999 and later joined Verizon Communications (Formerly Bell Atlantic) USA, in 1999 to 2002 as a Senior Business Analyst.

Phase3 Telecom
In 2003, Jegede helped found Phase3 Telecom, a firm licensed to offer national long distance transmission services using fibre optic, initially within the territory of Nigeria. Jegede was appointed as a member of the Broadband Committee inaugurated by President Goodluck Jonathan.

Phase 3 was awarded the International Arch of Europe award for Quality, a vanity award as well as best Infrastructure Service Provider award 2012, in the Africa-America International business awards.

Philanthropy 
In 2014, he launched the Stanley Jegede Foundation (SJF), a non-governmental organization solely set up to join local and global efforts in eradicating social and economic challenges facing Nigeria's local communities and indeed a larger part of the African continent.

Through projects that center on education, health, welfare, emergency relief, art heritage and international/group support initiatives that run on frameworks with enhanced technological innovation and initiatives. With education being considered as the key platform as well as driving force that is capable of engineering and sustaining the desired affluence for Africa and its peoples. And in 2016, the foundation ran its Education Development Program (EDP) in two northern states through advocacy, scholarships, mentor programs; donor/funding initiatives and infrastructure projects.

References

Living people
Nigerian businesspeople
Year of birth missing (living people)